Claude Penz (23 July 1924 – 6 March 2006) was a French alpine skier who competed in the 1948 Winter Olympics.

References

1924 births
2006 deaths
French male alpine skiers
Olympic alpine skiers of France
Alpine skiers at the 1948 Winter Olympics